Masurian Landscape Park is a designated Polish Landscape Park protected area within Warmian-Masurian Voivodeship, in northern Poland. It is one of the largest landscape parks in Poland.

It was established in 1977, and is a Natura 2000 EU Special Protection Area.

Geography

The Park lies within Warmian-Masurian Voivodeship, in:
 Mrągowo County — Gmina Mikołajki, Gmina Mrągowo, and Gmina Piecki
 Pisz County — Gmina Pisz, Gmina Orzysz, and Gmina Ruciane-Nida
 Szczytno County — Gmina Świętajno

Features
The Park contains the biggest Polish lake called Śniardwy, with an area of 114.16 km2, together with lakes of Kaczerajno and Seksty. Other bigger lakes include Bełdany (9.41 km2), Mokre (8.15 km2), Łuknajno (6.92 km2), Mikołajskie (4.98 km2), Warnołty (4.65 km2) and Zdrużno (2.52 km2). There are also over 20 smaller dystrophic lakes in the Krutynia river basin.

Within the Landscape Park are 11 nature reserves, including that of Łuknajno Lake, a Ramsar site also designated by UNESCO as a biosphere reserve due to its unique bird habitat.

General information
 Total area: 536.55 km2
 Forested area: 290 km2
 Water area (rivers and lakes): 180 km2
 Protected area: 186.08 km2
 Number of settlements: 29
 Number of permanent residents: approx. 4,800

See also

Special Protection Areas in Poland
 Masurian dialect

References

 Rozporządzenie Nr 4 Wojewody Warmińsko-Mazurskiego z dnia 14 stycznia 2005 r. w sprawie Planu Ochrony Mazurskiego Parku Krajobrazowego

Masurian
Parks in Warmian-Masurian Voivodeship
Natura 2000 in Poland
Mrągowo County
Pisz County
Szczytno County
1977 establishments in Poland
Protected areas established in 1977